The following is a list of international rankings of Serbia.

Culture

Demographics

Economy

Education

 Education Index
 United Nations Development Programme: literacy rate

Environment

Yale University: Environmental Sustainability Index
 Environmental Performance Index

Globalization 
 
 A.T. Kearney/Foreign Policy Magazine: Globalization Index

Geography

Military

 Institute for Economics and Peace / EIU: Global Peace Index

Politics

 Transparency International: Corruption Perceptions Index
Freedom House: Freedom of the Press (report)

Society

University of Leicester  Satisfaction with Life Index  
New Economics Foundation  Happy Planet Index

Tourism

World Economic Forum: Travel and Tourism Competitiveness Report

References

Serbia